Tabibuga is the District HQ of Jimi District in Jiwaka Province of Papua New Guinea. The magnetic declination in Tabibuga, Papua New Guinea is +4.70°.

References

Jimi District
Populated places in Jiwaka Province